This is a list of members of the Teylers Tweede Genootschap (Teylers Second Society) by year of appointment. There are six members in the society. The dates shown indicate the terms of the members, who generally serve for life, though they had to be residents of Haarlem under the age of 70, so sometimes they retired early.

Original appointed members 
The original members as appointed by testament of Pieter Teyler van der Hulst were: 
 Gerrit Willem van Oosten de Bruijn (1778 - 1797)
 Cornelis Elout (1778 - 1779)
 Jan Bosch (1778 - 1780)
 Johannes Enschedé Sr. (1778 - 1780)
 Jean le Clé (1778 - 1802)
 Bernardus Vriends (1778 - 1791)

Later members 
Members that were added later: 
 Martinus van Marum (1779 - 1837)
 Jean Gijsbert Decker (1780 - 1808), resigned
 Willem Anne Lestevenon (1780 - 1797), resigned
 Pieter Hermannes Klaarenbeek (1791 - 1797), resigned
 Johannes Enschedé Jr. (1797 - 1799)
 Jan van der Roest (1797 - 1814)
 Jossue Teyssedre l'Ange (1797 - 1853)
 Christiaan Brunings (1799 - 1805)
 Adriaan van den Ende (1802 - 1842), resigned
 Joseph Chrysostomus Bernardus Bernard (1805 - 1836), resigned
 Pieter Hermannes Klaarenbeek (1811 - 1812), resigned
 Adriaan van der Willigen (1812 - 1841)
 Caspar Georg Carl Reinwardt (1814 - 1854)
 Johannes Enschedé III (1836 - 1866)
 Jacobus Albertus van Bemmelen (1838 - 1853)
 Jacques Gisbert Samuel van Breda (1841 - 1867)
 Jan Justus Enschedé (1842 - 1850), resigned
 Hugo Beijerman (1850 - 1870)
 Peter Elias (1853 - 1878) 
 Jan Geel (1853 - 1858), resigned
 Jan van der Hoeven (1854 - 1868)
 Jeronimo de Bosch Kemper (1858 - 1876)
 Volkert Simon Maarten van der Willigen (1866 - 1878)
 Adriaan van der Willigen Pz. (1867 - 1876), resigned
 Douwe Lubach (1868 - 1902)
 Robert Jacobus Fruin (1870 - 1899)
 Adriaan Justus Enschedé (1876 - 1896)
 Arie Cornelis Kruseman (1876 - 1894)
 Carel Johannes Matthes (1878 - 1882)
 Elisa van der Ven (1878 - 1909)
 Hendrik Jacob Scholten (1882 - 1907)
 Jeronimo de Vries (1894 - 1914), resigned
 Theodorus Marinus Roest (1896 - 1898)
 Johan Wilhelmus Stephanik (1898 - 1905)
 Pieter Lodewijk Muller (1899 - 1904)
 Hugo de Vries (1902 - 1935)
 Petrus Johannes Blok (1905 - 1929)
 Henri Jean de Dompierre de Chaufpié (1905 - 1911)
 Ernst Wilhelm Moes (1907 - 1911)
 Hendrik Antoon Lorentz (1909 - 1928)
 Adolf Octave van Kerkwijk (1911 - 1949), resigned
 Cornelis Hofstede de Groot (1912 - 1930)
 Gerard Kalff (1914 - 1924)
 Jan Willem Muller (1928 - 1957)
 Adriaan Daniël Fokker (1930 - 1945), resigned
 Johan Huizinga (1930 - 1945)
 Wilhelm Martin (1930 - 1954)
 Lourens Baas Becking (1935 - 1940), resigned; (1941 - 1945), resigned
 Jan Steffen Bartstra (1945 - 1959) 
 Pieter Nicolaas van Eyck (1945 - 1950), resigned
 Victor Jacob Koningsberger (1946 - 1965)
 Johan Willem Frederiks (1949 - 1959)
 Pieter Minderaa (1950 - 1965)
 Johan Quirijn van Regteren Altena (1954 - 1970)
 Jacob Kistemaker (1957 - ?)
 Hendrik Enno van Gelder (1959 - ?)
 Johan Christiaan Boogman (1959 - ?)
 Cornelis Frederik Petrus Stutterheim (1965 - 1973)
 Maurits Henri van Raalte (1965 - ?)
 Sturla Jonasson Gudlaugsson (1970 - 1971)
 Theodoor Herman Lunsingh Scheurleer (1971 - ?)
 Henri Albert Gomperts (1973 - ?)
 Harm Habing (? -  2008/2009) 
 Rob Visser (? -  - 2012/2013)
 Ilja Veldman (? -  2014/2015) 
 Arent Pol (?  - current) -->
 Louise Vet (?  - current) -->
 Niek van Sas (?  - current)
 Wim van Anrooij (?  - current) 
 Wim van Saarloos (2008/2009 - current)
 Frans van Lunteren (2012/2013 - current)
 Yvonne Bleyerveld (2014/2015 - current)

References
 Teyler 1778-1978:studies en bijdragen over Teylers Stichting naar aanleiding van het tweede eeuwfeest, by J. H. van Borssum Buisman, H. Enno van Gelder, Pieter Teyler van der Hulst, Schuyt, 1978, 

Teylers Tweede Genootschap